Muhammad 'Abd al-Wahhab can refer to:

Muhammad ibn Abd al-Wahhab (1703–1792), Theologian
Mohammed Abdel Wahab (1902–1991), Egyptian singer
Muhammad Abdul Wahhab (1923–2018), Pakistani Islamic preacher
Mohamed Abdul Wahab (swimmer) (born 1958), Kuwaiti swimmer
Mohamed Abdelwahab Abdelfattah (born 1962), Egyptian composer
Mohamed Abdelwahab (1983–2006), Egyptian footballer